A 6-phospho-beta-galactosidase is an enzyme that catalyzes this chemical reaction:

a 6-phospho-beta-D-galactoside + H2O  6-phospho-D-galactose + an alcohol

Thus, the two substrates of this enzyme are 6-phospho-beta-D-galactoside and H2O, whereas its two products are 6-phospho-D-galactose and alcohol.

This enzyme belongs to the family of hydrolases, specifically those glycosidases that hydrolyse O- and S-glycosyl compounds.  The systematic name of this enzyme class is 6-phospho-beta-D-galactoside 6-phosphogalactohydrolase. Other names in common use include phospho-beta-galactosidase, beta-D-phosphogalactoside galactohydrolase, phospho-beta-D-galactosidase, and 6-phospho-beta-D-galactosidase.  This enzyme participates in galactose metabolism.

Structural studies

References

 

EC 3.2.1
Enzymes of known structure